The Shehu Shagari College of Education is a state government higher education institution located in Sokoto, Sokoto State, Nigeria. It is affiliated to Ahmadu Bello University and Usmanu Danfodiyo University for its degree programmes. The current Provost is Wadata Hakimi.

History 
The Shehu Shagari College of Education was established in 1970. It was formerly known as Advanced Teacher's College until 1995.

Courses 
The institution offers the following courses;

 Education and Arabic
 Education and Chemistry
 Technical Education
 Early Childhood Care Education
 Education and Biology
 Integrated Science
 Fulfulde
 Education and Geography
 Education and History
 Computer Education
 Education and Social Studies
 Hausa
 Education and Economics
 Islamic Studies
 Education and Mathematics
 Business Education
 Primary Education Studies
 French
 Physical and Health Education
 Agricultural Science and Education
 Education and Integrated Science
 Fine And Applied Arts
 Education and English Language
 Home Economics and Education
 Special Education
 Education and Islamic Studies

Affiliation 
The institution is affiliated with the Ahmadu Bello University and Usmanu Danfodiyo University to offer programmes leading to Bachelor of Education, (B.Ed.) in;

 Chemistry
 Physical & Health Education
 Mathematics
 Social Studies Education
 Hausa
 Arabic
 Business Education Studies
 Islamic Studies
 Biology
 Home Economics Education
 History
 English
 Geography
 Integrated Science Education
 Economics
 Agricultural Science Education
 Primary Education Studies

References 

1970 establishments in Nigeria
Sokoto
Universities and colleges in Nigeria
Educational institutions established in 1970